Attorney General Gordon may refer to:

John Gordon (South Londonderry MP) (1849–1922), Attorney-General for Ireland
John Hannah Gordon (1850–1923), Attorney-General of South Australia
Thomas Gordon (lawyer) (1652–1722), Attorney General of New Jersey
William Gordon (New Hampshire politician) (1763–1802), Attorney General of New Hampshire

See also
General Gordon (disambiguation)